Sugar Island may refer to:

Islands
Sugar Island (Michigan), in the St. Marys River between Michigan and Ontario
Sugar Island (Detroit River), another Michigan island located in the Detroit River
Sugar Island (Ohio), one of the Bass Islands in Lake Erie
Sugar Island (St. Lawrence River), in the Thousand Islands region of Ontario
Sugar Island (Maine), largest island of Moosehead Lake

Administrative divisions
Sugar Island Township, Michigan

Unincorporated communities
Sugar Island, Wisconsin